George Armstrong (1822 – 1 September 1905) was a 19th-century Member of Parliament in Canterbury, New Zealand.

Biography

He was born in St John's, Nova Scotia and first visited Banks Peninsula in command of a trading brig in the 1840s. He was in charge of the schooner Edwin Stanley during the New Zealand Wars, and was court-martialled for taking his vessel to the rescue of a settler attacked by Māori while carrying stores for troops at Wanganui. He settled in Akaroa on Banks Peninsula.

He represented the Akaroa electorate on the Canterbury Provincial Council from 1861 to 1862, and the Wainui electorate from 1862 to 1863.

Of the six candidates, he came third.

His son George Armstrong (1853–1932) was on the Akaroa Borough Council for 50 years from 1879, including nearly 30 years as mayor.

References

1822 births
1905 deaths
New Zealand MPs for South Island electorates
Members of the Canterbury Provincial Council
People of the New Zealand Wars
Members of the New Zealand House of Representatives
Unsuccessful candidates in the 1887 New Zealand general election
Canadian emigrants to New Zealand
People from Akaroa
British emigrants to New Zealand
19th-century New Zealand politicians